Zoom Airlines Ltd was a British scheduled, low-fare, transatlantic airline,  the sister company to Zoom Airlines Inc., based in Canada. Zoom Airlines Ltd was based in Crawley, West Sussex, England.

Zoom Airlines Ltd operated year-round scheduled services to the United States, United Kingdom, and Bermuda, as well as charter services to Asia, South America and the Caribbean destinations with several European tour operators.

Zoom Airlines Limited held a United Kingdom Civil Aviation Authority Type A Operating Licence (Number OL/A/540), which permitted it to carry passengers, cargo, and mail on aircraft with 20 or more seats.

On 28 August 2008 Zoom suspended all operations and filed for bankruptcy protection due to deteriorating financial position.

History

Zoom Airlines Limited was founded in the summer of 2006 as a low-fare transatlantic airline. The carrier, based in London, was conceived by two Scottish brothers Hugh and John Boyle, to fill an emerging opportunity in the UK-US leisure travel market.

During the summer of 2006, the Bank of Scotland Growth Equity acquired a minority stake in Zoom Airlines Inc. as part of a £5.7m investment package. This provided the additional funds for the start up of the UK airline now called Zoom Airlines Ltd.

In the summer of 2007, Zoom Airlines Ltd commenced flights to Bermuda and New York.

In December 2007, Zoom Airlines Ltd announced two new US routes to San Diego and Fort Lauderdale, due to commence in the summer of 2008.

On 28 August 2008, Zoom announced that they were ceasing operations due to rising oil prices. All aircraft will be returned to their respective lessors, and all flights were cancelled.

Destinations

Europe
United Kingdom
Cardiff (Cardiff Airport)
Glasgow (Glasgow International Airport)
London (London Gatwick Airport), hub
France
Corsica (Calvi - Sainte-Catherine Airport)

North America
Bermuda
Ferry Reach (Bermuda International Airport)
United States of America
Fort Lauderdale (Fort Lauderdale-Hollywood International Airport), seasonal
New York City (John F. Kennedy International Airport) 
San Diego (San Diego International Airport)

South America
Guyana
Georgetown (Cheddi Jagan International Airport) (charter)

Caribbean
Trinidad and Tobago
Port of Spain (Piarco International Airport) (charter)

Fleet
The Zoom Airlines Limited fleet consisted of the following aircraft (as of 10 July 2008):

References

External links
Zoom Airlines

Defunct airlines of the United Kingdom
Airlines established in 2006
Airlines disestablished in 2008
Defunct European low-cost airlines
2006 establishments in England
2008 disestablishments in England
British companies established in 2006
British companies disestablished in 2008